Vallées en Champagne (literally Valleys in Champagne) is a commune in the Aisne department of northern France. The municipality was established on 1 January 2016 and consists of the former communes of Baulne-en-Brie, La Chapelle-Monthodon and Saint-Agnan.

See also 
Communes of the Aisne department

References 

Communes of Aisne
Communes nouvelles of Aisne
Populated places established in 2016

2016 establishments in France